Israel was represented in the Eurovision by David D'Or who sang the bilingual English / Hebrew song "Leha'amin" (Hebrew script: להאמין; English translation: "To Believe"). The song was co-written by D'Or and Ehud Manor.

Before Eurovision

Artist selection 
On 13 November 2003, IBA announced that David D'Or was selected by a special committee as the Israeli representative for the Eurovision Song Contest 2004. Among artists considered by the selection committee, Hamsa, Ninet Tayeb, Zehava Ben and Ron Shoval were highly considered before D'Or was ultimately selected. Among the members of the committee were Avraham Natan, Liel Kolet (singer), Lior Narkis (2003 Israeli Eurovision entrant) and Gali Atari (Eurovision Song Contest 1979 winner).

Kdam Eurovision 2004 
The song that David D'Or represented Israel with in Istanbul was selected through a national final called Kdam Eurovision 2004. Four songs were selected for the competition and were presented during a presentation show on 5 February 2004, which took place at the Nokia Stadium in Tel Aviv during a break in a televised Maccabi Tel Aviv Euroleague basketball game and hosted by Merav Miller. The winning song "Leha'amin" was selected by a combination of the votes from an expert jury of IBA representatives (40%) and votes from the public (60%). The basketball game attracted 13.7% of Israeli TV viewers.

At Eurovision
For the Eurovision Song Contest 2004, a semi-final round was introduced in order to accommodate the influx of nations that wanted to compete in the contest. Because Israel placed 19th at the 2003 contest, country was forced to compete in the first Eurovision semi-final, held on 12 May 2004. David D'Or performed 5th, following Latvia and preceding the Andorra his song in the semi-final receiving 57 points which was not enough to qualify for the final. Therefore, Israel had to compete in the semi-final again in ESC 2005. 19% of Israeli viewers watched on television. The song missed qualifying for the final by one position – thus requiring Israel to qualify from the semifinal at their next Contest appearance.

During Eurovision rehearsal week, D'Or left Istanbul to be with his father, who had to have one of his legs amputated due to complications of diabetes. His father has since died.

Voting

Points awarded to Israel

Points awarded by Israel

References

2004
Countries in the Eurovision Song Contest 2004
Eurovision